The 1985 Virginia Slims of New Orleans was a women's tennis tournament played on indoor carpet courts at the UNO Lakefront Arena in New Orleans, Louisiana in the United States that was part of the Category 3 tier of the 1985 Virginia Slims World Championship Series. It was the second edition of the tournament and was held from September 23 through September 29, 1985. First-seeded Chris Evert-Lloyd won the singles title.

Finals

Singles
 Chris Evert-Lloyd defeated  Pam Shriver 6–4, 7–5
 It was Evert-Lloyd's 8th singles title of the year and the 140th of her career.

Doubles
 Chris Evert-Lloyd /  Wendy Turnbull defeated  Mary-Lou Piatek /  Anne White 6–1, 6–2

References

External links
 ITF tournament edition details
 Tournament fact sheet

Virginia Slims of New Orleans
Virginia Slims of New Orleans
1985 in Louisiana
1985 in American tennis